The Devario monticola, is a fish belonging to the minnow family (Cyprinidae).  It is endemic to Sri Lanka. However, the validity of the species description was noted problematic by several other local ichthyologists.

Description
Body with 4–5 dark irregular vertical bars on anterior half. Danionin notch present. Lateral line complete. Dorsum light yellowish brown with a metallic sheen. Body silvery sheen laterally and ventrally. Vertical bars metallic blue with bright yellowish interspaces. Fins hyaline.

Ecology
It is found from torrential waters of Agra Oya, a tributary of Mahaweli river.

References 

Devario
Cyprinid fish of Asia
Freshwater fish of Sri Lanka
Fish described in 2017